The Bristol Ensemble, formerly the Emerald Ensemble, is a professional chamber orchestra, based in Bristol, England. The ensemble has been in existence since 1994, when it was formed as a musicians' collective by violinist Roger Huckle. Their repertoire includes classical, popular, jazz and contemporary music. The size of the group depends on the programmes being performed and can range from trios to a full complement of 70 or so musicians. They perform standing up (except in orchestral concerts).

The Bristol Ensemble tours regularly throughout the South West of England and further afield, with a large number of performances in Bristol at venues including the Bristol Beacon, St Georges, Brandon Hill and Bristol Cathedral. The Ensemble give approximately 60 concerts a year and work with soloists.

The ensemble regularly accompanies screenings of silent movies. In 2008, as the Emerald Ensemble, they performed at a local nightclub to some acclaim, and in autumn 2009 they performed with William Goodchild and Roni Size, and also with Crippled Black Phoenix and the solo artist Joe Volk under the curation of Geoff Barrow. The Bristol Ensemble also undertakes outreach work with schools, colleges and older people. They regularly record for television and film, including much work for the BBC Natural History Unit and they have produced several CDs of their work.

Discography
  Live At Colston Hall (2015) Roni Size & Reprazent with William Goodchild and The Emerald Ensemble

References

Musical groups from Bristol
English classical music groups